The Widow Bewitched is a 1730 comedy play by the British writer John Mottley.

The original Goodman's Fields cast included William Giffard as Colonel Courtly, Henry Giffard as Stanza and Anna Marcella Giffard as Matilda.

References

Bibliography
 Burling, William J. A Checklist of New Plays and Entertainments on the London Stage, 1700-1737. Fairleigh Dickinson Univ Press, 1992.
 Nicoll, Allardyce. History of English Drama, 1660-1900, Volume 2. Cambridge University Press, 2009.

1730 plays
Plays by John Mottley
Comedy plays